In generative grammar, a parasitic gap is a construction in which one gap appears to be dependent on another gap. Thus, the one gap can appear only by virtue of the appearance of the other gap, hence the former is said to be "parasitic" on the latter. For example, in the example sentence in (1) the first gap is represented by an underscore ( __ ), and appears as a result of movement of the constituent which explanation to the beginning of the sentence. The second gap is represented by an underscore with a subscript p ( __p); this is the "parasitic gap".
{|
|-
|(1)|| Which explanation did you reject __ without first really considering  __p ?
|}

While parasitic gaps are present in English and some related Germanic languages, e.g. Swedish (see Engdahl 1983), their appearance is much more restricted in other, closely related languages, e.g. German and the Romance languages. Japanese linguistic scholar Fumikazu Niinuma has attempted to differentiate between parasitic gaps and coordination in his research, as he believes the two are often confused.

An aspect of parasitic gaps that makes them particularly mysterious is the fact they usually appear inside islands to extraction. Although the study of parasitic gaps began in the late 1970s, no consensus has yet been reached about the best analysis.

The phenomenon

The example sentences in (2) are normal declarative sentences that contain no gap at all. The sentences in (3), in contrast, contains two gaps, whereby the second gap is parasitic on the first; the parasitic gap is marked with a p-subscript. The sentences in (4) show that if there is no real gap (that corresponds to the bold-faced constituent), then the parasitic gap is not possible. 
{|
|(2)
| colspan="2" |no gap
|-
|
|a.
| You reviewed that book without actually reading it.
|-
|
|b.
|They played that song repeatedly despite not liking it.
|-
|
|c.
|You bought that old bike in order to fix it up.
|}
{|
|-
|(3)
| colspan="2" |parasitic gap possible with real gap
|-
|
|a.
|What book did you review __ without actually reading __p?
|-
|
|b.
|Which song did they play __ repeatedly despite not liking __p?
|-
|
|c.
|Which old bike did you buy __ in order to fix __p up?
|}

{|
|-
|(4)
| colspan="2" |parasitic gap impossible without real gap
|-
|
|a.
|*You reviewed that book without actually reading __p.
|-
|
|b.
|*They played that song repeatedly despite not liking __p.
|-
|
|c.
|*You bought that old bike in order to fix __p up.
|}
The appearance of parasitic gaps in (3) appears to be reliant on syntactic movement (e.g. wh-movement or topicalization), and presents two challenges:

 The fact that there are two gaps but only one fronted wh-expression is a source of difficulty for the analysis of parasitic gap constructions. Why can one fronted wh-expression license two gaps?
 The fact that parasitic gaps usually appear inside extraction islands leads one to expect extraction from the site of the parasitic gap to be altogether impossible. Why do parasitic gaps ignore islands?.

History

Discovery 
The phenomenon of parasitic gaps appears to have been discovered by John Robert Ross in the 1960s, but remained undiscussed until papers by Knut Tarald Taraldsen and Elisabet Engdahl explored the properties of the phenomenon in detail. The analysis of parasitic gaps was central to the development of the GPSG framework (Generalized Phrase Structure Grammar) in the mid 1980s, and this analysis was later refined  in the HPSG framework (Head-driven Phrase Structure Grammar) of Carl Pollard and Ivan Sag. In the 1990s, a debate centered around the best theoretical analysis of parasitic gaps, namely extraction versus percolation. This debate culminated in a collection of essays edited by Peter Culicover and Paul Postal in 2001.

Controversy

Extraction gap versus proform 
The theoretical analysis of parasitic gaps is not a settled matter by any means, since accounts of the phenomenon vary drastically. In very broad terms, there are two lines of analysis that one can pursue:

 The extraction analysis assumes that parasitic gaps are extraction gaps, and that parasitic gaps arise by way of the same basic mechanism that licenses "normal" extraction gaps. This sort of approach must augment the analysis of extraction gaps in some way in order to accommodate parasitic gaps under the same theoretical umbrella. Extraction analyses have the advantage that they immediately accommodate the simple observation that most parasitic gaps appear to be dependent on the occurrence of wh-movement or topicalization. Extraction analyses are challenged, however, by missing-object constructions, as noted above.
 The proform analysis assumes that parasitic gaps actually contain a covert element, this element having the status of definite proform. Proform analyses have the advantage that they immediately accommodate the simple observation that many parasitic gaps occur optionally; the covert proform has the option to be overt. Proform analyses are challenged, however, by the fact that most parasitic gaps occur in the immediate environment of wh-movement or topicalization, since they do not provide a clear basis for explaining this correlation.

Some analyses mix and match these two basic lines of analysis, although in general, both are well represented in the literature on parasitism and most accounts can be placed in the one or the other camp.

Licensing of real gap 
The controversy regarding the licensing of parasitic gaps has also been widely debated as the phenomenon has continued to be researched. It is generally agreed upon that a real gap licenses a parasitic gap however, the required properties of this real gap have been widely debated. In 1994, Postal wrote a paper examining how the leftward extraction of clauses may be a general licensor for parasitic gaps while examining two theoretical approaches:

 P-Gap Licensing Restriction (PLR) suggests that the gaps that license parasitic gaps must be restricted in some way. 
 PG=NP suggests that the licensors of parasitic gaps must be NPs/DPs.

On the basis of evidence from topicalization and object raising, Postal's 1994 paper concludes that true parasitic gaps are not licensed by rightward DP movement, but rather by leftward extraction of a clause. Overfelt 2016 argues against Postal's claim that rightward DP movement cannot license true parasitic gaps, and concludes that the licensors of true parasitic gaps are adjunction structures.

Some traits of parasitic gaps

Some of the central research issues that arise in the investigation of parasitic gaps include:
optionality: many parasitic gaps are optional
obligatoriness: some parasitic gaps are obligatory
missing object: the appearance of parasitic gaps in missing object constructions (also known as tough-movement)
parallelism: syntactic parallelism seems to promote the appearance of parasitic gaps

Often optional

Many parasitic gaps appear optionally. They are in non-complementary distribution with a pronoun, meaning that the speaker has the choice whether to employ the gap or not.  The example sentences in (5) contain typical parasitic gaps, whereas the ones in (6) use a pronoun instead of the gap. In other words, in these contexts, the parasitic gap is optional. Optionality like this suggests an analysis of parasitism in terms of ellipsis, since optionality is the primary trait of known ellipsis mechanisms.

{|
|-
|(5)
| colspan="2" |parasitic gap present
|-
|
|a.
|Which dish did you order __ after you tried __p?
|-
|
|b.
|Which movie will they like __ as soon as they see __p?
|}
{|
|-
|(6)
| colspan="2" |parasitic gap absent
|-
|
|a.
| Which dish did you order __ after you tried it?
|-
|
|b.
|Which movie will they like __ as soon as they see it? 
|}

Sometimes obligatory
 
While many parasitic gaps occur optionally, other parasitic gaps occur obligatorily; this can be seen when the parasitic gap precedes the "real" gap. The example sentences in (7) are normal declarative sentences that contain no gap at all. The sentences in (8), in contrast, contain two gaps, with the parasitic gap preceding the real gap. We know that the first gap (the leftmost gap) in (8) is parasitic on the following gap because it, i.e. the leftmost gap, appears inside what is normally an extraction island (marked with square brackets). As for the sentences in (9) — which are strongly marginal (indicated by the double question mark notation ??) — they show that in a sense, the real gap can also be dependent on the parasitic gap. This aspect of parasitic gaps is related to weak crossover (WCO).  WCO occurs when a fronted expression is coreferential with an intermediate expression that appears between the fronted expression and the position of its gap.

{|
|-
|(7)
| colspan="2" |no gap
|-
|
|a.
| The rumor about the girl annoyed her.
|-
|
|b.
|If you get to know him, you will like Bill.
|}
{|
|-
|(8)
| colspan="2" |parasitic gap precedes real gap
|-
|
|a.
| Which girl did [the rumor about __p] annoy __?
|-
|
|b.
|Bill is the type of guy who [if you get to know __p], you will like __.
|}
{|
|-
|(9)
| colspan="2" |real gap marginal if parasitic gap absent; weak crossover violation
|-
|
|a.
|??Which girl did the rumor about her annoy __?
|-
|
|b.
|??Bill is the type of guy who if you get to know him, you will like __.
|}
In the big picture, one can simply note that parasitic gaps behave variably depending upon whether they precede or follow the "real" gap. When they precede the "real" gap, their appearance is usually obligatory.

Missing object
 
Much work on parasitism assumes that parasitic gaps are dependent on the existence of another gap. The assumption is that parasitic gaps are reliant on the mechanisms that license normal extraction gaps such as wh-movement and topicalization. This assumption is challenged, however, by so-called missing-object constructions, also known as tough-constructions or tough-movement. The example sentences in (10) lack gaps entirely. The sentences in (11) contain parasitic gaps despite the fact that neither wh-movement nor topicalization has occurred. These sentences illustrate a missing-object construction, since the verbs appreciate, understand, and get are transitive and should hence take an object. This object is missing, as marked by the gap on the left. Whatever the analysis of parasitic gaps ends up being in the long run, it will have to accommodate the facts involving missing objects illustrated here. Movement (wh-movement, topicalization) may not actually be the key factor licensing parasitic gaps.

{|
|-
|(10)
| colspan="2" |no gap||
|-
|
|a.
| It is easy to appreciate her after getting to know her.||
|-
|
|b.
|It is hard to understand this essay without reading it several times.
|
|-
|
|c.
|It will be tough to get the motor running without entirely rebuilding it.
|
|}
{|
|-
|(11)
| colspan="2" |parasitic gap despite lack of wh-fronting or topicalization||
|-
|
|a.
| She is easy to appreciate __ after getting to know __p.||
|-
|
|b.
|This essay is hard to understand __ without reading __p several times.
|
|-
|
|c.
|The motor will be tough to get __ running without entirely rebuilding __p.
|}

Show structural parallelism

Examining the examples of optional parasitic gaps produced above so far, one sees that in each case, a certain structural parallelism is present, where both the real gap and the parasitic gap bear the grammatical function of direct object. This parallelism is now explicitly illustrated using brackets. In each of these examples, the square brackets mark what appear to be parallel structures, similar to the type of coordinate structure found coordination. The brackets mark verb phrases (VPs), and the subordinator appearing between the brackets is functioning like a coordinator (i.e. and, or, or but). This parallelism may be a significant factor that is aiding the appearance of the parasitic gaps.

{|
|-
|(12)
| colspan="4" |structural parallelism:
|OBJECT
|
|
|OBJECT
|
|-
|
|a.
|Which manuscript
|did you
|[VP resubmit
|__ ]
|after
|[VP revising
|__p ]
|?
|-
|
|b.
|Which report
|did you
|[VP file
|__ ]
|without
|[VP reading
|__p ]
|?
|-
|
|c.
|Which old bike
|did he
|[VP buy
|__ ]
|in order to
|[VP fix up
|__p ]
|?
|-
|
|d.
|Which foods
|does he
|[VP fantasize about
|__ ]
|without
|[VP  ever eating
|__p ]
|?
|-
|
|e.
|Which girl
|did you
|[VP ask out
|__ ]
|before
|[VP meeting
|__p ]
|in person?
|}

When the real gap and the parasitic gap are not structurally parallel — as when the real gap bears the grammatical function of subject, while the parasitic gap bears the grammatical function of object — there is a significant drop in acceptability of the parasitic gap. The examples in (13) show that, in such contexts, parasitic gaps are all marginal to varying degrees.
{|
|(13)
| colspan="3" |structural non-parallelism:
|SUBJECT
|
|
|
|OBJECT
|
|-
|
|a.
|?
|Who
|[XP  __ 
|secretly supports John ] 
|without
|[XP John secretly supporting
|__p
|back ]?
|-
|
|b.
|?
|Which girl
|[XP  __ 
|likes Billy ]
|without
|[XP Billy liking
|__p
|back ]?
|-
|
|c.
|?
|Which spy
|[XP  __ 
|escaped ] 
|without
|[XP anyone first identifying
|__p
|]?
|-
|
|d.
|??
|Which explanation
|[XP  __ 
|had to be repeated ]
|for
|[XP us to finally get
|__p
|]?
|-
|
|e.
|??
|Which report
|[XP  __ 
|was filed ]
|without
|[XP any of us first reading
|__p
|]?
|}

The marginality of the examples in (13) correlates with the lack of syntactic parallelism. What exactly explains this drop in acceptability is not entirely clear, although it may have to do with ease of processing. Parallel structures are easier for humans to process, and hence parasitic gaps are facilitated by contexts that have a low processing load.

See also

Coordination
Crossover
Ellipsis
Syntactic movement
Topicalization
Tough movement
Verb phrase
Wh-movement

Notes

References

Chomsky, N. 1986. Barriers. Cambridge, MA: The MIT Press.
Cinque, G. 1990. Types of Ā-dependencies. Cambridge, MA: MIT Press.
Contreras, H. 1984. A note on parasitic gaps. Linguistic Inquiry 15, 698–701.
Culicover, P. 2001. Parasitic gaps: A history. In Parasitic Gaps, ed. by P. Culicover and P. Postal, 3–68. Cambridge, MA: The MIT Press.
Culicover, P. 2013. Grammar and complexity: language at the intersection of competence and performance. Oxford: Oxford University Press. 
Culicover, P. and P. Postal (eds.) 2001. Parasitic gaps. The MIT Press.
Engdahl, E. 1983. Parasitic gaps. Linguistics and Philosophy 6, 5–34.
Fiengo, R. and R. May 1994. Indices and identity. Cambridge, MA: MIT Press.
Levine, R, T. Hukari, and M. Calcagno 2001. Parasitic gaps in English: Some overlooked cases and their theoretical implications. In Parasitic Gaps, ed. by P. Culicover and P. Postal, 181–222. Cambridge, MA: The MIT Press. 
Munn, A. 2001. Explaining parasitic gap restrictions. In Parasitic Gaps, ed. by P. Culicover and P. Postal, 369–402. Cambridge, MA: The MIT Press.
Overfelt, J. 2016. Rightward DP-Movement Licenses Parasitic Gaps: A Reply to Postal 1994. Linguistic Inquiry, 127–146. 
Postal, P. 1994. Parasitic and pseudo-parasitic gaps. Linquistic Inquiry 25, 63–117 [Reprinted in 2001 in Parasitic Gaps, ed. by P. Culicover and P. Postal, 253–313. Cambridge, MA: The MIT Press].
Postal, P. 2001. Further Lacunae in the English parasitic gap paradigm. In Parasitic Gaps, ed. by P. Culicover and P. Postal, 223–253. Cambridge, MA: The MIT Press.
Ross, J. 1967. Constraints on variables in syntax. Ph.D. Dissertation, MIT.
Ross, J. 1986. Infinite syntax! Norwood, NJ: ABLEX [Reprinted dissertation from 1967].
Williams, E. 1990. The ATB theory of parasitic gaps. The Linguistic Review 6, 265–279.
Yoshida, M., Hunter, T., & Frazier, M. 2015. Parasitic Gaps licensed by elided syntactic structure. Natural Language & Linguistic Theory 33, 1439–1471.

Generative syntax
Syntactic transformation
Word order